Protoblastenia is a genus of lichens in the family Psoraceae. It was originally circumscribed by Alexander Zahlbruckner in 1908 as a section of genus Blastenia. J. Steiner promoted it to generic status in 1911.

Species
Protoblastenia calva 
Protoblastenia calvella 
Protoblastenia cyclospora 
Protoblastenia incrustans 
Protoblastenia laeta 
Protoblastenia lilacina 
Protoblastenia rupestris 
Protoblastenia siebenhaariana

References

Lecanorales
Lichen genera
Lecanorales genera
Taxa described in 1908
Taxa named by Alexander Zahlbruckner